Duljin (also Romanized as Dūljīn, Dooljin, and Dūlajīn; also known as Tūlūn) is a village in Sojas Rud Rural District, Sojas Rud District, Khodabandeh County, Zanjan Province, Iran. At the 2006 census, its population was 349, in 73 families.

References 

Populated places in Khodabandeh County